Leonard Joseph Hyde (6 May 1876 − 30 December 1932) was an English professional footballer who played as a Winger(or midfielder) for a number of clubs around the turn of the 1900s.

Born in Birmingham, he was playing for Wellingborough Town until he moved to Tottenham Hotspur in May 1899. He played for Spurs from 1899 to 1902 in the Southern and District Combination League, the Southern League and the Western League. In his last season at the club he captained the reserve team.

He then returned to Wellingborough and in the 1903−04 season he was at Brighton & Hove Albion.

For the 1904−05 season he moved to Doncaster Rovers who had just been elected to the Football League. He scored once, against Leicester Fosse, in a total of 33 League and FA Cup matches. Following Doncaster's unsuccessful application for re-election to League 2 for 1905−06, he again returned to Wellingborough Town.

Hyde died in Birmingham in 1932 at the age of 56.

Honours 
Tottenham Hotspur
Southern League First Division: 1899–1900

References

1876 births
1932 deaths
Footballers from Birmingham, West Midlands
English footballers
Association football wingers
Tottenham Hotspur F.C. players
Brighton & Hove Albion F.C. players
Doncaster Rovers F.C. players
Wellingborough Town F.C. players
English Football League players